Clynish (Gaeilge: Claínis) is an inhabited intensively farmed island in Clew Bay, County Mayo, Ireland.

Demographics

References

Islands of County Mayo